Progesterone 3-oxime (P4-3-O), also known as 3-(hydroxyimino)pregn-4-en-3-one, is a progesterone derivative which was never marketed. It is a progestogen oxime – specifically, the C3 oxime of the progestogen progesterone. Progesterone C3 and C20 oxime conjugates, like progesterone 3-(O-carboxymethyl)oxime, have been found to be water-soluble prodrugs of progesterone and pregnane neurosteroids.

See also
 List of progestogen esters § Oximes of progesterone derivatives

References

Abandoned drugs
Ketones
Pregnanes
Progestogens
Steroid oximes
Ketoximes